Largo railway station served the village of Lower Largo, Fife, Scotland from 1857 to 1965 on the East of Fife Railway.

History 
The station opened on 11 August 1857 by the Leven and East of Fife Railway. To the north was a good yard and to the east of the eastbound platform was the signal box. It was replaced in 1894 and was situated at the east end of the westbound platform. The station closed on 6 September 1965, with the signal box closing in the same year.

References 

Disused railway stations in Fife
Railway stations in Great Britain opened in 1857
Railway stations in Great Britain closed in 1965
Beeching closures in Scotland
1857 establishments in Scotland
1965 disestablishments in Scotland
Former North British Railway stations